Kenneth Eng is an American documentary film director and editor. He is best known for his work on the documentary films My Life in China, Kokoyakyu: High School Baseball and Take Me to the River.

Life and career
Kenneth was born and raised in Boston, Massachusetts. He graduated from Boston Latin School, afterward moved to New York to study film at the School of Visual Arts in 1994. His thesis film, Scratching Windows, about graffiti writers, was broadcast on PBS nationally.

Kenneth's documentary film, Take Me to the River, about the Maha Kumbh Mela festival in Allahabad, India. In 2006, he directed the feature documentary, Kokoyakyu: High School Baseball, about the Koshien Tournament in Japan, was broadcast on PBS nationally.

In 2014, Kenneth directed My Life in China, a documentary about his father’s history since leaving China and coming to America, premiered at the San Diego Asian Film Festival.

Filmography

Awards and honors
 2007 Guggenheim Fellowship
 2015 - won Best Documentary Feature at the San Diego Asian Film Festival for My Life in China

References

External links

Living people
American documentary film directors
Year of birth missing (living people)
Filmmakers from Massachusetts
American film directors of Chinese descent
School of Visual Arts alumni
Artists from Boston